"New Topographics: Photographs of a Man-Altered Landscape" was a groundbreaking exhibition of contemporary landscape photography held at the George Eastman House's International Museum of Photography (Rochester, New York) from October 1975 to February 1976.   The show, curated by William Jenkins, had a lasting impact on aesthetic and conceptual approaches to American landscape photography. The New Topographics photographers, including Robert Adams, Lewis Baltz, Bernd and Hilla Becher, Frank Gohlke, Nicholas Nixon, and Stephen Shore, documented built and natural landscapes in America, often capturing the tension between natural scenery and the mundane structures of post-war America: parking lots, suburban homes, crumbling coal mines. The photographs, stark and documentary, are often devoid of human presence. Jenkins described the images as "neutral" in style, "reduced to an essentially topographic state, conveying substantial amounts of visual information but eschewing entirely the aspects of beauty, emotion, and opinion.”

Details
For "New Topographics", William Jenkins selected eight then-young American photographers: Robert Adams, Lewis Baltz, Joe Deal, Frank Gohlke, Nicholas Nixon, John Schott, Stephen Shore, and Henry Wessel, Jr. He also invited the German couple, Bernd and Hilla Becher, who were teaching at the Kunstakademie Düsseldorf in Germany. Since the late 1950s the Bechers had been photographing various obsolete structures, mainly post-industrial carcasses or carcasses-to-be, in Europe and America. They first exhibited them in series, as "typologies", often shown in grids, under the title of "Anonymous Sculptures." They were soon adopted by the conceptual art movement.

Each photographer in the New Topographics exhibition was represented by ten prints. All but Stephen Shore worked in black and white. The prints were in a 20 cm × 25 cm (8″×10″) format except for Joe Deal (32 cm × 32 cm), Gohlke (24 cm × 24 cm – close enough to 8"×10" though obviously square rather than rectangular), and the Bechers with typical European (for the time) 30 cm × 40 cm prints.

In his introduction to the catalogue, Jenkins defined the common denominator of the show as "a problem of style:" "stylistic anonymity", an alleged absence of style. Jenkins mentioned Edward Ruscha's work, especially the numerous artist books (26 Gasoline Stations (1962), Various Small Fires (1964), 34 Parking Lots (1967), etc.) that he self-published in the 1960s as one of the inspirations for the exhibition and the photographers it features (except for the Bechers).

Technically, half the photographers were working with 8″×10″; (20 cm × 25 cm) large format view cameras; those who were not were using either square medium format (Deal, Gohlke), or in the case of Baltz, 35 mm Technical Pan, a slow and high-definition Kodak film that the photographer printed on 8″x10″ paper. Only Baltz and Wessel were using regular 35 mm cameras and film. A notable element of the show was that the artists were, or would be, linked with higher education as students, professors, or both—a change from the preceding generations. The shift from craft or self-teaching to academia had somewhat been started by photographers such as Ansel Adams and Minor White, but the new generation was turning away from the approach of these forebears. This was illustrated by the subject matter that the New Topographics chose as well as their commitment to casting a somewhat ironic or critical eye on what American society had become. They all depicted urban or suburban realities under changes in an allegedly detached approach. In most cases, they gradually revealed themselves as coming from rather critical vantage points, especially Robert Adams, Baltz, and Deal.

The exhibition was recreated in various locations: in 1981, six years after its original presentation, it was shown in reduced form at the Arnolfini Gallery, Bristol, UK, under the auspices of Paul Graham and Jem Southam. A large scale presentation of the exhibition was organized in 2009 at the Center for Creative Photography in Tucson. "New Topographics" began an international tour in 2009, with stagings at the George Eastman House in Rochester, New York, and the Los Angeles County Museum of Art. In 2011 the exhibition was on view at the Nederlands Fotomuseum in Rotterdam, Netherlands, and later at the Bilbao Fine Arts Museum in Spain.

Although the eight photographers included in the original exhibition make up the core of the New Topographics school, photographers such as Laurie Brown have been tied to the school.

References

External links 
 New Topographics (Redux) Review of a rehanging of the original exhibition

1975 in art
1975 in New York (state)
1975 works
History of Rochester, New York
Photography exhibitions